Josias Hendrik Otto du Plessis (23 February 1907 - 1960) was Administrator of the Cape Province in South Africa from 1953 to 1958.

He was born in Vanrhynsdorp and was elected as a Member of Parliament for Stellenbosch in 1953.

References

1907 births
1960 deaths
Afrikaner people